The 2008–09 season was the 119th season in the existence of FC Girondins de Bordeaux and the club's 18th consecutive season in the top flight of French football. In addition to the domestic league, Bordeaux participated in this season's editions of the Coupe de France, the Coupe de la Ligue, the Trophée des Champions, the UEFA Champions League, and the UEFA Cup.

Players

First-team squad

Out on loan

Competitions

Overview

Trophée des Champions

Ligue 1

League table

Results summary

Results by round

Matches
The league fixtures were announced on 23 May 2008.

Coupe de France

Coupe de la Ligue

UEFA Champions League

Group stage

The group stage draw was held on 28 August 2008.

UEFA Cup

Final phase

Round of 32

References

External links

FC Girondins de Bordeaux seasons
Bordeaux
French football championship-winning seasons